The Dau-Webbenhorst Barn, southeast of Buhl, Idaho, was built in 1913 by Henry Schick, a German-Russian immigrant to the United States.  It was listed on the National Register of Historic Places in 1983.

References

Barns on the National Register of Historic Places in Idaho
Commercial buildings completed in 1913
Buildings and structures in Twin Falls County, Idaho
German-Russian culture in Idaho
1913 establishments in Idaho
National Register of Historic Places in Twin Falls County, Idaho